is a Tokyu Tamagawa Line station located in Ōta, Tokyo.

Station layout
Two ground-level side platforms.

History
November 1, 1923 Opened as 矢口駅 (Yaguchi eki).
May 21, 1930 Renamed to the present name.

References 

Railway stations in Tokyo
Tokyu Tamagawa Line
Stations of Tokyu Corporation
Railway stations in Japan opened in 1923